Martin Truttmann (born 16 January 1944) is a Swiss former sports shooter. He competed in two events at the 1972 Summer Olympics.

References

1944 births
Living people
Swiss male sport shooters
Olympic shooters of Switzerland
Shooters at the 1972 Summer Olympics
Place of birth missing (living people)